Yusri Al Basha (Arabic:يسري الباشا) is a Saudi football forward who played for Saudi Arabia in the 1992 Asian Cup. He also played for Al Ittifaq and Al Khaleej.

References

External links

1979 births
Living people
Saudi Arabian footballers
2004 AFC Asian Cup players
Ettifaq FC players
Khaleej FC players
Al-Fayha FC players
Al-Adalah FC players
Saudi First Division League players
Saudi Professional League players
Saudi Second Division players
Association football forwards
Saudi Arabia international footballers
Saudi Arabian Shia Muslims